Gengler is a German surname.

Notable people with the surname include:

 Heinrich Gottfried Philipp Gengler, German academic
 Karl Gengler (1886–1974), German politician
 Marjory Gengler, American tennis player
 Sarah Gengler (born 1963), American Olympic rower

German-language surnames